The badminton tournaments at the 2016 Summer Olympics in Rio de Janeiro took place from 11 to 20 August at the fourth pavilion of Riocentro. A total of 172 athletes competed in five events: men's singles, men's doubles, women's singles, women's doubles, and mixed doubles.

Similar to 2012 format, a combination of group play and knockout stages had been maintained at these Games. In all the doubles tournaments, the Badminton World Federation instituted several changes to the competition rules after the match fixing scandal from the previous Olympics, as all pairs finishing second in their groups would be placed into another draw to determine who they face in the next round, while the top pair in each group must have a fixed position matched to its designated seed in the knockout phase.

The Games made use of about 8,400 shuttlecocks.

Qualification

The Olympic qualification period took place between 4 May 2015 and 1 May 2016, and the Badminton World Federation rankings list, scheduled to publish on 5 May 2016, was used to allocate spots. Unlike the previous Games, nations could only enter a maximum of two players each in the men's and women's singles, if both were ranked in the world's top 16; otherwise, one quota place until the roster of thirty-eight players had been completed. Similar regulations in the singles tournaments also applied to the players competing in the doubles, as the NOCs could only enter a maximum of two pairs if both were ranked in the top eight, while the remaining NOCs were entitled to one until the quota of 16 highest-ranked pairs was filled.

For each player who had qualified in more than one discipline, an additional quota place in each of the singles tournaments would have become free. If no player from one continent had qualify, the best ranked player from a respective continent would have got a quota place.

Schedule

Participation

Participating nations

Competitors

Medal summary

Medal table

Medalists

Results

Men's singles

Women's singles

Men's doubles

Women's doubles

Mixed doubles

References

External links 

 
 
 Results Book – Badminton

 
2016 Summer Olympics events
2016
Summer Olympics
Olympics